Mark Mazzoleni is an American retired ice hockey coach.

Career
Mazzoleni played college hockey at Michigan State, graduating with a degree in Pre-Law in 1980. After a year he matriculated to the University of Illinois Chicago, serving as an assistant coach while also earning a master's in sports administration. In 1985 he got his first head coaching job with the Wisconsin–Stevens Point Pointers and went on to lead the team to three consecutive Division III National Championships.

After the 1991 title, he took a position as an assistant coach at the University of Minnesota. He remained with the club for three seasons before he got the opportunity to be the head coach of a Division I school. Mazzoleni stepped into the Miami job after George Gwozdecky left and, while he had success with the team (3 winning seasons in 5 years), he could not sustain the high level of success his predecessor had achieved. He was able to parlay his experience at Miami into a second head coaching job, this time at Harvard, replacing the embattled Ronn Tomassoni who had not been able to get the Crimson to post a winning season in 5 years. After a one-season hangover, Mazzoleni returned Harvard to ECAC prominence, winning the conference tournament in both 2002 and 2004 while finishing as the runner-up in 2003.

Similar to what he had done with Wisconsin–Stevens Point, after three successful seasons Mazzoleni left Cambridge, Massachusetts to take over as head coach of the Green Bay Gamblers, a USHL team based in his hometown. Mazzoleni seemed to be working the same magic he had at Harvard and Wisconsin–Stevens Point when the Gamblers made the playoffs in his second season, their first appearance in 4 years, but after another moderately successful campaign Green Bay took  a sharp dip in the standings, finishing the 2007–08 season dead last with a 13–41–6 record and his tenure as coach was terminated.

Rather than hit the road for his next opportunity, Mazzoleni remained in the Green Bay area and founded a property restoration company, PuroClean, that specialized in repairing water, fire and similar damage to buildings. While he was establishing his new venture, Mazzoleni returned to the coaching ranks, serving as an assistant at St. Norbert College under Tim Coghlin, a member of Mazzoleni's first recruiting class as a head coach. Mazzoleni eventually stepped away from the game, focusing entirely on his business beginning in 2014.

Head coaching record

College

References

External links

1956 births
American ice hockey coaches
Harvard Crimson men's ice hockey coaches
Miami RedHawks men's ice hockey coaches
Living people
Ice hockey coaches from Wisconsin
Ice hockey players from Wisconsin